The 2022–23 Women's Senior Inter Zonal One Day was the inaugural edition of the Women's Senior Inter Zonal One Day, a domestic one day cricket competition in India. The tournament took  place from 12 to 21 February 2023, with six zonal teams taking part. The tournament followed the 2022–23 Women's Senior Inter Zonal T20 in being the first tournament involving women's zonal teams in India since the 2017–18 Senior Women's Cricket Inter Zonal Three Day Game. The tournament was won by North Zone, who beat Central Zone by 9 wickets in the final.

Competition format
Six teams competed in the tournament, representing regions of India. Each team played each other once in a round-robin format. The top two teams in the group progressed to the final. Matches were played using a one-day format with 50 overs per side. Matches were played across three venues in or near Hyderabad: Rajiv Gandhi International Cricket Stadium, Gymkhana Ground and ECIL Ground.

The group worked on a points system with positions within the group being based on the total points. Points were awarded as follows:

Win: 4 points. 
Tie: 2 points. 
Loss: 0 points. 
No Result/Abandoned: 2 points.

If points in the final table were equal, teams were separated by most wins, then head-to-head record, then Net Run Rate.

Group stage

Points table

Fixtures

Final

Statistics

Most runs

Source: BCCI

Most wickets

Source: BCCI

References

Women's Senior Inter Zonal One Day
2023 in Indian cricket